Pyu language  may refer to:

Pyu language (Papuan), a Papuan language of Papua New Guinea
Pyu language (Sino-Tibetan), an ancient Sino-Tibetan language of Burma

See also
Piu language, an Austronesian language of Papua New Guinea
Puyuma language (ISO 639 code: pyu), an Austronesian language of Taiwan